Dennis Taylor (born 5 May 1990) is a Jamaican professional footballer who plays as a goalkeeper for the club Humble Lions and the Jamaica national team.

International career
Taylor debuted with the Jamaica national team in a 2–0 friendly win over Bermuda on 11 May 2020. He was called up to represent Jamaica at the 2021 CONCACAF Gold Cup.

References

External links
 
 

1990 births
Living people
Jamaican footballers
Jamaica international footballers
Association football goalkeepers
National Premier League players
2021 CONCACAF Gold Cup players